Neptūnas-Akvaservis is a professional Lithuanian basketball club which currently plays in National Basketball League. Klaipėdos Viesulas professional basketball club was founded in 1987. In 1996 club name was changed to BC "Universitetas-Irvinga" because of the club supporters Klaipėda University, since then club name slightly been changed due to new sponsorships. In 2017 the club was partnered with 1st  Klaipeda’s team  Neptūnas, since then club is named “Neptūnas-Akvaservis”.

Current roster

Squad changes for/during the 2022–23 season

In

|}

Out

|}

Season by season

Notable players
  Arvydas Macijauskas (1996–1997)
  Osvaldas Kurauskas (1997–1998)
  Irmantas Milišauskas (2002–2005)
  Aidas Viskontas (2003–2006)
  Marius Runkauskas (2003–2007)
  Deividas Gailius (2005–2007)
  Egidijus Dimša (2006–2007)
  Osvaldas Kurauskas (2006–2008)
  Mindaugas Mockus (2008–2010)
  Mindaugas Girdžiūnas (2011)
  Artūras Gudaitis (2012)
  Valdas Vasylius (2017-2018)

References 

Basketball teams in Lithuania
Sport in Klaipėda
Basketball teams established in 1987
1987 establishments in Lithuania
National Basketball League (Lithuania) teams